Abdullah Keseroğlu (born 7 February 1988) is a Turkish footballer who plays for SC Düsseldorf-West.

External links
 
 
 Abdullah Keseroğlu on Fupa

1988 births
Living people
People from Antakya
Turkish footballers
Turkey youth international footballers
Bayer 04 Leverkusen II players
Borussia Mönchengladbach II players
VfL Osnabrück players
MKE Ankaragücü footballers
FC 08 Homburg players
Sportfreunde Siegen players
3. Liga players
Süper Lig players
Association football midfielders
Sportspeople from Hatay